Denis Martin Byrne (born 24 October 1974) is an Irish sportsperson who is a hurling All Star. He played with his local club Graigue–Ballycallan, in County Kilkenny, from 1991-2009, and with Kilkenny senior inter-county hurling team from 1994 until 2002, including a period as captain. He is currently involved in skills training with the Dublin Senior Hurling team.

He won a Minor All-Ireland medal with Kilkenny in 1991, an All-Ireland Under-21 Hurling Championship in 1994 and a National Hurling League medal in 1995. He was on the Kilkenny All-Ireland Senior winning side in 2000 and was awarded an All-Star during the same year.

Career

In 1988, Byrne played with Callan CBS to win Roinn B All-Ireland Colleges Juvenile Hurling Champion, and went on to win the Roinn B All-Ireland Colleges Senior Hurling Championship of 1991 where they beat Coláiste Spiorad Naomh (Cork) 1-14 to 1-0. Byrne won an All-Ireland Minor Hurling Championship medal with Kilkenny in 1991 when they beat Tipperary 0-15 : 1-10 at Croke Park. He won an All-Ireland Under 21 Hurling Championship with Kilkenny in 1994 and was the leading scorer in the campaign.

Byrne played in the All-Ireland Under 21 Hurling Championship final in 1995.
He won a National Hurling League medal for Kilkenny in 1995 when Kilkenny beat Clare 2–12:0–9. He played in the Leinster Senior Hurling Championship final of 1995, where Kilkenny were beaten by Offaly 2-16:2-5. He missed the 1996 championship due to injury. He played with Kilkenny in the All-Ireland Senior Hurling Championship of 1997 where Kilkenny were beaten by Clare 1-17 to 1-14 in the All Ireland semi- final. He was on the All-Ireland Senior Hurling Championship panel of 1998. He played with Graigue-Ballycallan in the Kilkenny Senior Hurling Championship final of 1998 where they beat The Fenians 1-14:0-12.

Byrne was captain of Kilkenny for the All-Ireland Senior Hurling Championship final of 1999 where they were runner-up to Cork 0-13 – 0-12. He played with Graigue–Ballycallan in the Kilkenny Senior Hurling Championship final of 1999 where they lost to Glenmore 1-14 : 2-08.

He played on the Kilkenny All-Ireland Senior Hurling Championship winning side of 2000, and was awarded an All-Star during the same year. He played with Graigue-Ballycallan in the Kilkenny Senior Hurling Championship final of 2000 where they beat O'Loughlin Gaels 0-16 : 0-09. He captained the Kilkenny team in the All-Ireland Senior Hurling Championship of 2001 where they won the leinster final beating Wexford. He played with Graigue–Ballycallan in the Kilkenny Senior Hurling Championship final of 2001 where they lost to O'Loughlin Gaels 1-17 : 1-06.

Byrne played for the Tipperary senior hurling team when he transferred to Mullinahone in South Tipperary in 2003. He won two south Tipperary Senior hurling medals in 2003 and 2004

Honours
All Stars 2000 (1)
AIB Leinster Club Player of the Year (1)
2000
All-Ireland Senior Hurling Championship (1)
 2000; runner-up 1998, 1999
Leinster Senior Hurling Championship (4)
1998, 1999, 2000, 2001; runner-up 1995, 1997
National Hurling League (2)
1995, 2002
 Leinster Club winner 2000
 All Ireland club runners up 2001
 Kilkenny Senior Hurling  winners (2)1998 and 2000  runner-up 1999 ,2001] 
 Oireachtas winner 1999
 Ryan Cup winner Carlow IT 1993
 All Ireland Senior colleges winner 1991 
 All Ireland Junior Colleges winner  1988
 Under 14 Poc Fada All Ireland winner 1988
 All Ireland under 21 winner 1994 runner up 1995
 Leinster under 21 winner 1994 and 1995
 All Ireland Minor winner 1991.
 Leinster minor winner 1991 and 1992
 All Ireland Senior Inter Firms 1994
 Munster Senior inter firms winner 1994.
 South Tipperary Senior Hurling (2) 2003 and 2004

See also
 Graigue–Ballycallan GAA
 Kilkenny GAA
 Tipperary GAA
 List of Kilkenny senior hurling team captains
 List of All-Ireland Senior Hurling Championship medal winners

Notes

Further reading

External links 
 Official
 
 
 Unofficial
 

1974 births
Living people
Kilkenny inter-county hurlers
Graigue-Ballycallan hurlers
Tipperary inter-county hurlers
All-Ireland Senior Hurling Championship winners